Metastelma arizonicum, synonym Cynanchum arizonicum, the Arizona swallow-wort or Arizona climbing milkweed, is a plant native to Arizona, New Mexico and Sonora. It is a twining, herbaceous vine with whitish to yellow flowers, growing on rocky slopes and in canyons of desert mountain ranges.

References

arizonicum
Flora of Arizona
Flora of Sonora
Flora of New Mexico
Plants described in 1883